Electric Castle is an annual music festival held on the Transylvanian domain of the Bánffy Castle, near Cluj-Napoca in Romania, and combines music, technology and alternative arts. It features many genres of music including rock, indie, hip hop, electronic, techno, and drum and bass as well as art installations.

In the seventh edition, the festival has received the award for the Best Medium Sized Festival at the European Festival Awards, where Electric Castle has been nominated since its existence. On its past editions, the festival had confirmed names such as Florence + the Machine, Thirty Seconds to Mars, The Prodigy, Nils Frahm, Skrillex, Bring me the Horizon, Deadmau5, alt-J, Franz Ferdinand, Fatboy Slim, Sigur Ros, Bastille, Rudimental, Thievery Corporation, Die Antwoord, Twenty One Pilots, Gorillaz and many other artists that performed on one of its ten stages.

History

EC 1 - 2013 
The first edition of Electric Castle Festival took place from June 21 to 23.  More than 32.000 people passed through the festival's gates and on the 4 stages over 90 artists performed.

Lineup:

Morcheeba, Pendulum DJ Set, Feed Me, James Zabiela, Fritz Kalkbrenner, Dope DOD, Dub Pistols, Stanton Warriors, A Skillz, Krafty Kuts, Wankelmut and Telepopmusik and many others.

EC 2 - 2014 

The second edition of the Electric Castle Festival took place from June 19 to 22. It had an audience of 79,000 (11,000 only in the camping area), becoming the second biggest Romanian music event ever. The 2014 edition went under the slogan of "bigger, stronger, better", with 4 festival days, 5 stages and over 130 artists.

One of the first headliners of the festival, Rusko, was announced in December 2013. Rusko was about to perform for the first time in Romania. The list continued with artists like Thievery Corporation, DJ Fresh and Bonobo. Due to medical reasons Rusko had to cancel the concert being replaced by Dub FX.

Die Antwoord were announced as the headliner in March 2014,Gramatik and Sasha being the last names announced to perform this year. Die Antwoord have included Romania in their world tour for the first time as well. Their concert will represent the release of their new album called Donker Mag.

The number of the artists invited was 130, the number of stages on which the artists performed was 5.

Lineup:

Die Antwoord, Thievery Corporation, Bonobo,  Dub FX, DJ Fresh, Gramatik, Chris Liebing, Kraak and Smaak, Wilkinson, Foreign Beggars, Delta Heavy, Oliver Koletzki, Dub Pistols, Akua Naru, DJ EZ, Suie Paparude, Notes and Ties Orchestra, The Correspondents, Adam Freeland, Fred V & Grafix, Gramophonedzie and many others.

EC 3 - 2015 
The third edition of Electric Castle took place from June 25 to 28. It had an audience of 97.000 people, 6 musical stages and over 150 performing artists. The festival spread on 10.000 square meters surface.

Lineup:

The Prodigy, Rudimental, Fatboy Slim, The Parov Stelar Band, The Cat Empire, The Glitch Mob, Maya Jane Coles, Sub Focus, Sigma. Netsky Live, The Subways, Nouvelle Vague, Roni Size Reprazent and many others.

EC 4 - 2016 
The fourth edition of Electric Castle took place from July 14 to 17. With a new festival setup, spread on 18.000 square meters surface, the festival brought over 120.000 people in 4 Days.

Lineup:

Skrillex, Bring Me the Horizon, Sigur Rós, Bastille, Paul Kalkbrenner, Gorgon City, Enter Shikari, Rusko, Flux Pavilion, Dilated Peoples, Camo & Krooked, Pan-Pot, Art Department and many others.

EC 5 - 2017 
The fifth edition of Electric Castle took place between the 12th and 16 July 2017. Held under the motto "The most spectacular EC yet", it was the biggest edition of Electric Castle until that time with over 171.000 visiting the festival during the 5 days.

Lineup:

Deadmau5, Franz Ferdinand, Zedd, Alt-J, Paul van Dyk, Moderat, Nero, Duke Dumont and many others.

EC 6 - 2018 
The sixth edition of Electric Castle (EC6) took place between July 18–22. Held under the "Meet me at the Castle" motto, EC6 continued the festival's expansion with a 30% increase on the festival grounds and covered structures for more than 25.000 people.

Lineup:

Damian Marley, Jessie J, Mura Masa, Richie Hawtin, Groove Armada, San Holo, Wolf Alice, Subcarpați, Little Big, Kensigton, Alison Wonderland, Little Boots and many others.

2018 saw the first Elrow party in Romania and the first stage takeover for a festival in Romania with the Hospitality - Hospital Records - drum and bass night at a secondary stage.

EC 7 - 2019 

The seventh edition of Electric Castle (EC7) took place between July 17–21. Held under the "All things hidden/All things beautiful" motto, EC7 highlighted the contrasts a festival goer sees during the daytime vs during nighttime. This year was also the first time New Media Castle, a showcase of art installations by visual artists, took place inside the castle and the adjacent buildings.

Lineup:

Florence + The Machine, Thirty Seconds to Mars, Limp Bizkit, Bring Me the Horizon, CHVRCHES, Sofi Tukker, Metric, The Vaccines, Zeds Dead, Zomboy, Jauz, Sigma, Infected Mushroom, The Black Madonna, Lamb, TOKiMONSTA, Polo&Pan, and many others.

Accessibility for the hearing impaired

Electric Castle 2019 was the first Romanian festival to implement a sign language translator for the hearing impaired with the help of Amber Galloway Gallego and her team. The sign language interpreters were positioned on a raised platform on the right of the Main Stage and translated all major acts.

EC 8 - 2021* 

The eight edition of Electric Castle (EC8) should have taken place between July 14–18, 2021.

Expected 2021 Lineup:

Twenty One Pilots, The Chemical Brothers, Placebo, Foals, Aurora, The Neighbourhood, Machine Gun Kelly, Sheck Wes, Fisher, Zhu, Bicep, Rezz, Amon Tobin  and many others.

EC_Special - 2021 

As the pandemic led to constantly changing sanitary regulations, the organizers chose to postpone EC 8 for 2022 and came up with a new concept, adapted for those uncertain times. 

EC_Special brought back, between August 6-15  2021, the festival vibes everyone has been missing so much. The 10-day festival was an eclectic journey across 30 venues in Cluj-Napoca and the legendary Bonțida. 

Lineup:

More than 300 music and new media acts. The most awaited artists were Asaf Avidan, Aurora, Sigma, Noisia, Mind Against, HVOB and Ben Böhmer.

EC 8 - 2022 

The next edition of Electric Castle (EC8) took place between 13-17 July, 2022 and brought more than 272,000 participants during the whole festival period. Over 5 days, participants who chose to camp right next to the festival, became the residents of an awesome mini-society called EC Village. The sold out campsite welcomed 15,000 people and the dedicated stage from this area was one of the 10 music stages at the festival. 

Hundreds of artists performed on the other stages, among which the most anticipated were: Twenty One Pilots, Gorillaz, Disclosure, Moderat, Caribou, Editors, Mogwai, Yves Tumor, WhoMadeWho, DJ Seinfeld, Apashe, Lola Marsh or Balming Tiger.

EC 9 - 2023 
The ninth edition of the festival is scheduled on 19-23 July, 2023. The first wave of artists will be headlined by The Chemical Brothers, Iggy Pop, George Ezra, Pendulum (LIVE) and Peggy Gou. More artists will be announced.

The Castle 

Bánffy Castle (or Bonţida Bánffy Castle) is an architectonic Baroque monument situated in Bonţida, a village in the vicinity of Cluj-Napoca, Romania. It was built during the 15th century and was owned by the Bánffy family (of which Miklós Bánffy was a member). The owner is Katalin Banffy.

The castle was desecrated during World War II by German troops and neglected by the communist regime in Romania; it is currently being restored by the Transylvania Trust as a cultural center. Through the presence of the Transylvania Trust and the Institute of Historic Building Conservation, who are the organizers of the International Built Heritage Conservation Training Centre set up within the Castle, the high quality restoration and long term protection can be ensured.

Electric Castle Festival is supporting the restoration process by donating an amount of the money earned from the tickets sale.

Impact 
The festival generates revenue for the Bonțida community as a large number of locals convert their homes into hostels to provide accommodation for the festival goers. Also, some locals provide parking spaces for the participants' cars and cheap alternatives for food and drinks.

The organisers have raised money for the Bánffy Castle's restoration, and managed to restore the roof and build flooring, through the ongoing Give me a Brick campaign, encouraging festival goers to donate "bricks" or "mortar" through the festival bars. The "bricks" and "mortar" are sums of money equivalent to an actual brick and an actual bucket of mortar.

Through the continued implication of festival sponsors, the sports ground for the local school was restored and furniture was bought for classrooms.

Awards 

2013 - After the first edition in 2013, the festival was nominated by European Festivals Awards for the Best New Festival and Best Medium Size Festival titles, later on being shortlisted at the Best Medium Size Festival among festivals such as Melt!, Balaton Sound, I Love Techno or Volt.

2014 - The festival was again shortlisted among the best European festivals by European Festivals Awards

2015 - Electric Castle was shortlisted for the third time for the Best Medium Sized Festival by European Festivals Awards

2017 - Electric Castle was shortlisted for the fourth time for the Best Medium Sized Festival by European Festivals Awards

2017 - Electric Castle has received the award for Best Camping Award, by European Festivals Awards

2018 - Electric Castle was shortlisted for the fifth time for the Best Medium Sized Festival by European Festivals Awards

2018 - Electric Castle has received the award for Best Food & Drinks Award, by European Festivals Awards

2019 - Electric Castle was shortlisted for Green Operations, by European Festivals Awards

2019 - Electric Castle received the award for Best Medium Sized Festival by European Festivals Awards

See also
List of electronic music festivals

References

External links 

 Electric Castle Festival Official Website
Electric Castle 2015 - Official After Movie
 Electric Castle 2014 - After Movie
 Electric Castle 2013 - After Movie
 Electric Castle 2015 Review

Music festivals established in 2013
2013 establishments in Romania
Tourist attractions in Cluj County
Electronic music festivals in Romania
Summer events in Romania